Fort Mountain is a mountain located in Piscataquis County, Maine, within Baxter State Park.  Fort Mountain is flanked to the southeast by North Brother Mountain, and to the north by Mullen Mountain.  Although officially trailless, a well-defined herd path leads to the summit of Fort from North Brother.

Fort Mountain stands within the watershed of the Penobscot River, which drains into Penobscot Bay.  The south and east sides of Fort Mountain drain into Wassataquoik Stream, then into the East Branch of the Penobscot River.  The northeast side of Fort Mountain drains into Annis Brook, then into Wassataquoik Stream.  The northwest side of Fort drains into Little Nesowadnehunk Stream, then into Nesowadnehunk Stream, and the West Branch of the Penobscot River.

1944 C-54 plane crash 

The crew was unaware the aircraft had entered mountainous terrain and was still flying at the  elevation appropriate for passing over Bangor, Maine. The single passenger and all six crewmen were killed when the aircraft hit Fort Mountain. The aircraft burned, but some large pieces are still accessible and reasonably well preserved.

See also 
 List of mountains in Maine
 New England Hundred Highest

References 

Mountains of Piscataquis County, Maine
New England Hundred Highest
North Maine Woods